, is a Japanese utopian community founded by the author, artist and philosopher Saneatsu Mushanokōji, which has been approved as a foundation by the local government after its establishment.

History 
The village was founded in 1918 in Hyūga, in the mountains of Miyazaki Prefecture in Kyūshū, but in 1939 they were warned that much of their land was about to be submerged by the construction of a dam, so they searched for a new home and found 10 hectares in Moroyama, Iruma District, Saitama Prefecture. A few members remain at Hyūga to this day, but they are still to a certain extent dependent on the Saitama community and support from "external members". The village's population dropped to just two families during World War II, but many people moved into the Atarashiki-mura after the war. Saitama Prefecture approved the village as a foundation in 1948.

Mushanokōji worked at the village for a while, but later found that he could help it more by working outside and supporting it with the income from his novels, plays and paintings. There has always been a strong artistic bent at the Mura (as distinct from other religious or political communes, or the well-known Israeli kibbutzim) and many well-known artists lived there or supported it externally. Although there is an art gallery which also produces some publications, and various members have at times worked as potters, for much of its existence, most of the community's income has come from agriculture, including battery-hen eggs (and fertilizer produced from their manure), shiitake, rice, organic vegetables, and to a lesser extent green tea, apricots, and bread. There used to be a nursery school.

The income earned by activities in the village is pooled, and individual members receive only 'pocket money', but all other needs are met, including housing, food, medical care, and schooling. Members live in their own houses, in 'conventional' family units with private possessions, but most food is eaten in a communal dining area which also has a stage used for occasional plays and concerts. There are monthly meetings to decide any matters affecting the village, and in principle all decisions must be unanimous.

Premature rumours of Atarashiki-mura's demise have existed for decades, but it is a fact that the population is ageing and there is a shortage of new entrants, while children born in the village tend to migrate outside, so its future is far from secure. Membership in 2007 was 21 people in 16 households, with approximately 200 external supporters; there were five members in three households at the Hyūga site. By 2016 membership had declined further to 11 residents, many of whom were in their seventies. The surviving members are no longer young/fit enough to continue the egg business, and partly to offset the punitive effects of new tax regulations, large parts of the village land have been covered in solar panels, although the income from this is only guaranteed until around 2020, when the community is likely to face a financial crisis.

Ideals
The "spirit of Atarashiki-mura" is summed up in six lines written by Mushanokōji and reprinted on the back of each issue of the village's magazine.

 Our ideal is that all the world's people should fulfil their own destinies, and that the individuality residing in each one of them should be allowed to grow fully.
 One must not therefore allow the promotion of one's own individuality to infringe upon the individuality of others.
 Hence one must promote one's own individuality in a correct manner. One must not harm the destiny or just demands of other people merely for the sake of one's own pleasure, happiness or freedom.
 We will work so that all the world's people may share our ideals and choose the same style of life, and thereby walk along a path where they are able to fulfil their duties equally, enjoy freedom, lead correct lives and fulfil their destinies (including individuality).
 Those who endeavour to live this way, who believe in the possibility of such a way of life and pray or hope fervently that all the world's people may put it into practice, such people are members of Atarashiki-mura and are our brothers and sisters.
 We therefore believe that if all people embark upon a correct way of life, or endeavour to do so, and such people truly cooperate with each other, then the world we desire will come to be without struggle between nations nor between classes. We will do our utmost to achieve this goal.

Flag
The village has a flag, consisting of four colours (representing the four races) surrounded by blue (representing the world in which they should co-exist peacefully).

See also
Autonomous administrative division
Intentional communities
List of intentional communities
Kibbutz
Utopian
Utopian socialism
Cooperative
Yamagishi movement

References

 Zenzo Kusakari, Michael M. Steinbach, Moshe Matsuba, "The Communes of Japan: The Kibbutz on the Other Side of the World", (Imaichi Nihon Kyodotai Kyokai, 1977)

External links

 
 Atarashiki-mura art gallery
 Original site in Hyūga
 Japan Times article from 2001
 Photos from 1986-7

Utopian communities
Populated places established in 1918
Moroyama, Saitama
Socialism in Japan
Utopian socialism
Foundations based in Japan
Non-profit organizations based in Japan
1918 establishments in Japan
Autonomous administrative divisions